Waldburg is a town in the district of Ravensburg in Baden-Württemberg in Germany.  It is the home of Waldburg Castle, a medieval castle that sits atop the large hill in the town. The castle dates from the twelfth century, when Waldburg was a County of the Holy Roman Empire.

House of Waldburg

In 1424, the county was partitioned:
 Waldburg-Sonnenburg, annexed by Austria, 1511
 Waldburg-Trauchburg, partitioned in 1504:
 Waldburg-Capustigall, annexed by Prussia, 1745
 Waldburg-Trauchburg, partitioned in 1612:
 Waldburg-Friedburg-Scheer, restored in 1717
 Waldburg-Trauchburg, partitioned in 1717:
 Waldburg-Scheer, restored in 1764
 Waldburg-Trauchburg, annexed by Waldburg-Zeil, 1772
 Waldburg-Wolfegg-Zeil, partitioned in 1589:
 Waldburg-Waldburg, divided between Waldburg-Wolfegg and Waldburg-Zeil in 1660
 Waldburg-Wolfegg, partitioned in 1667:
 Waldburg-Waldsee, raised to principality in 1803, mediatised to Württemberg in 1806
 Waldburg-Wolfegg, annexed by Waldburg-Waldsee in 1798
 Waldburg-Zeil, partitioned in 1674:
 Waldburg-Wurzach, raised to principality in 1803, mediatised to Württemberg in 1806
 Waldburg-Zeil, raised to principality in 1803, mediatised to Württemberg in 1806

References

1424 disestablishments
Ravensburg (district)
States and territories established in the 12th century
House of Waldburg